Chemical Miracle is the second studio album by Australian punk rock band Trophy Eyes. The album was released on 14 October 2016 through Hopeless. It was produced by Shane Edwards at Karma Sound Studios in Thailand. The name comes from John Floreani's perception of life - everything is made of a chemical, and life itself is a miracle.

Background and promotion 
On 2 August 2016, a music video for "Chlorine" was released. 25 August the second song "Heaven Sent" was streamed through Hopeless. On 29 September 2016, a music video for "Breathe You In" was released. On 8 December 2016, Hopeless records published 'The Road to Chemical Miracle (Documentary)'.

The band later performed an Australian headline tour in support of the album.

Critical reception

Chemical Miracle received rave reviews upon its release. According to Metacritic, it currently holds an aggregated score of 87/100 based on 4 reviews, indicating "universal acclaim." Sputnikmusic writer Atari gave it a 4.3 out of 5 ("superb"), summarizing his review with "From continuous instrumental surprises to brutally honest lyrics, Trophy Eyes' sophomore effort is much more than a solid return, it’s an unanticipated punch to the gut - one that will leave the listener reeling as it rightfully earns its spot among the genre’s most passionate and achingly honest albums."

Punknews.org gave it 4 and a half out of 5 stars, stating "It's a brutally diverse album that has something for so many rock fans. It doesn't drag across...but instead races--pummeling--through a few genres that delivers something beyond wildest expectations."

Track listing
All lyrics and music by Trophy Eyes.

Personnel
Trophy Eyes
 John Floreani – lead vocals  
 Jeremy Winchester – bass guitar, backing vocals
 Kevin Cross – rhythm guitar
 Andrew Hallett – lead guitar
 Callum Cramp – drums, percussion

Production
 Shane Edwards – producer

Charts

References

2016 albums
Trophy Eyes albums
Hopeless Records albums